is a station on the Odakyu Odawara line, located in Setagaya, Tokyo.

Station layout
The elevated station features four tracks and two side platforms. Express trains typically bypass the station on the two innermost tracks while local trains typically stop at the station on the two outermost tracks.

Before tracks were quadrupled on this section of the Odawara Line in 2004, the station featured two tracks and two side platforms.

History 
Station numbering was introduced in 2014 with Gōtokuji being assigned station number OH10.

Surroundings
Gōtoku-ji (Temple)
Yamashita Station (Tokyu Setagaya Line)

References

Odakyu Odawara Line
Stations of Odakyu Electric Railway
Railway stations in Tokyo